Super Duty may refer to:
Ford Super Duty line of trucks
Ford Super Duty engine line of truck engines
an engine variant of the Pontiac Firebird car